Ilton de Oliveira Chaves (born 28 March 1937) is a Brazilian retired footballer and manager. He played as a midfielder.

Honours

Player
Atlético Mineiro
Campeonato Mineiro: 1955, 1956, 1958

Cruzeiro
Campeonato Mineiro: 1965, 1966, 1967, 1968
Taça Brasil: 1966

Manager
Cruzeiro
Campeonato Mineiro: 1972, 1973, 1974, 1975

Atlético Mineiro
Campeonato Mineiro: 1986

References

External links

1937 births
Living people
Sportspeople from Minas Gerais
Brazilian footballers
Association football midfielders
Clube Atlético Mineiro players
América Futebol Clube (MG) players
America Football Club (RJ) players
Cruzeiro Esporte Clube players
Brazil international footballers
Brazilian football managers
Campeonato Brasileiro Série A managers
Cruzeiro Esporte Clube managers
Valeriodoce Esporte Clube managers
Uberaba Sport Club managers
Ceará Sporting Club managers
América Futebol Clube (MG) managers
Sport Club do Recife managers
Santos FC managers
Santa Cruz Futebol Clube managers
Clube Náutico Capibaribe managers
Villa Nova Atlético Clube managers
Uberlândia Esporte Clube managers
Tupi Football Club managers